Plasmodium colombiense is a parasite of the genus Plasmodium.

Like all Plasmodium species P. colombiense has both vertebrate and insect hosts. The vertebrate hosts for this parasite are reptiles.

Description 
The parasite was first described by Ayala and Spain in 1976.

Geographical occurrence 
This species is found in Venezuela.

Clinical features and host pathology 
The only known host of this parasite is the iguanid lizard Anolis auratus.

References

Further reading 
 

colombiense